Father Damien Karras, SJ, is a fictional character from the 1971 novel The Exorcist, its 1983 sequel Legion, one of the main protagonists in the 1973 film The Exorcist, and a supporting character in The Exorcist III, the 1990 film adaptation of Legion. He is portrayed by Jason Miller.

Appearances

The Exorcist
In William Peter Blatty's 1971 novel, Father Damien Karras was one of the priests who exorcises the demon from young Regan MacNeil. He is a Jesuit psychiatrist suffering a crisis of faith. He searches for proof to lead an exorcism, yet during his investigation he comes to realize that there is no better way for God to prove His own existence than to reveal the foul presence of a demon; in God's perspective, He appeared not to waste His time on a skeptic, but instead to aid the callings of Father Lankester Merrin to rescue the child victim. During the exorcism, the demon frequently brings up the subject of Karras's mother's death and how he wasn't there to see her die, which seems to trouble Karras emotionally. Karras dies by throwing himself down a flight of stairs in order to purge the demon from his own body after having coaxed it out of Regan's.

Legion
In the 1983 sequel, it is revealed that after the demon departed, another evil spirit invaded Karras's body. Karras was found wandering and amnesiac, and was placed in the care of a mental hospital near Washington, D.C. While incarcerated there, the spirit suppresses Karras's personality and makes forays into the bodies of other patients in order to commit a series of ritual murders.

Adaptations
In the films The Exorcist and The Exorcist III, he is played by Jason Miller (who was in fact educated at the Jesuit University of Scranton).

Jack Nicholson was up for the part of Karras before Stacy Keach was hired by Blatty. According to The Exorcist director William Friedkin, Paul Newman also wanted to portray Karras. Friedkin then spotted Miller following a performance of Miller's play That Championship Season in New York. Even though Miller had never acted in movies, Keach's contract was bought out by Warner Bros. and Miller was signed.

Karras is voiced by Robert Glenister in the 2014 BBC Radio dramatization.

Fictional biography

Damien Karras was born on 12 April 1933 to a Greek family. He became a Jesuit priest on 30 July 1957. Over the years, the priest began to doubt the existence of God, the Devil, and many Biblical and supernatural beings. Still a Jesuit, he decided to become a psychiatrist.

Along with fellow-Jesuit Father Lankester Merrin, Karras attempts to exorcise 12-year-old Regan MacNeil (who was possessed by a demon). In the process, Merrin suffers a fatal heart attack and an embittered Karras provokes the possessed child, forcing the demon to channel itself into him instead. Karras, briefly dominated by the demon, throws himself out the window of the MacNeils's residence, seeing it as his chance to purge the world of the evil being; tumbling down the stairs of M Street to his death.

At the same time that Karras died, a criminal by the name of James Venamun (the infamous "Gemini Killer") was executed. The demon left the body of the dead Karras and placed Venamun's soul into Karras's body as a means of revenge for having been thrown out of Regan's. The body was switched prior to interment and an amnesiac Karras was found roaming the streets of Washington D.C.. Soon, he was placed under the care of a mental hospital. He remained in cell number eleven for 15 years.

His brain and bone tissues mended over time, but he alternated between his own personality and that of Venamun. Also, the spirit of Venamun left Karras's body by night to invade the other patients in the ward, making them commit murders for him without Venamun taking the blame. The "Gemini Killer" had come back to wreak havoc.

In the film, during the course of an exorcism, Venamun is forced to abandon Karras's body and Lt. William Kinderman shoots Karras several times, ending Karras's life for the final time. In the book, Venamun's father passes away from natural causes and Venamun wills Karras's body to die as he sees no more reason to remain in the world if he cannot continue to shame his father.

See also 
Exorcism of Roland Doe
Raymond J. Bishop
William S. Bowdern

References

The Exorcist characters
Fictional European-American people
Fictional Harvard University people
Fictional Christians
Fictional exorcists
Fictional priests and priestesses
Fictional suicides
Fictional psychiatrists
Characters in American novels of the 20th century
Literary characters introduced in 1971
Male horror film characters